Fairuz Renddan (born 11 September 1984) is a Malaysian politician from the GAGASAN party. He has been a Member of Sabah State Legislative Assembly for Pintasan since 2020.

Politics 
In 2020, He was appointed as the Political Secretary to the Chief Minister of Sabah, Hajiji Noor. He is also the former Youth Chief of BERSATU Sabah and former Youth Chief of BERSATU Kota Belud Division. On 2022, He quits BERSATU Sabah and then joined GAGASAN party in 2023 to expand his experience in politics and also to continue his struggle with all local political parties in Sabah.

Election result

Honours 
  :
  Companion of the Order of Kinabalu (ASDK) (2020)
  Commander of the Order of Kinabalu (PGDK) - Datuk (2022)

References

External links 
 

21st-century Malaysian politicians
Malaysian Muslims
Place of birth missing (living people)
Malaysian United Indigenous Party politicians
Members of the Sabah State Legislative Assembly
Bajau people
Living people
1984 births
Commanders of the Order of Kinabalu